Neocrepidodera peirolerii is a species of flea beetle from Chrysomelidae family that can be found in Austria, Bosnia and Herzegovina, France, Germany, Italy, Liechtenstein, North Macedonia, Slovenia, and Switzerland.

References

Beetles described in 1860
Beetles of Europe
peirolerii